Paracroesia is a genus of moths belonging to the subfamily Tortricinae of the family Tortricidae. They are found mainly in Russia, Japan, and Korea.

Species
Paracroesia abievora Issiki, 1961 - The holotype (male) is at National Museum of Natural History, Washington, DC, USA. The type locality is Osaka Prefecture, Honshu, Japan.
Paracroesia picevora Liu, 1990 The holotype (male) is at Institute of Zoology, Academia Sinica, Beijing, China. The type locality is Tianzhu, Gansu province, China.

See also
List of Tortricidae genera

References
 

Tortricini
Tortricidae genera